David Allen Lloyd (November 9, 1936 – August 9, 2014) was an American football player. He played linebacker for the Cleveland Browns, the Detroit Lions, and the Philadelphia Eagles in the National Football League (NFL). He played college football at the University of Georgia and was drafted in the fourth round of the 1959 NFL Draft.

He went to one Pro Bowl during his 12-year career. He died at the age of 77 at his home on August 9, 2014.

References

1936 births
2014 deaths
American people of Welsh descent
People from Sapulpa, Oklahoma
Players of American football from Oklahoma
American football linebackers
Georgia Bulldogs football players
Cleveland Browns players
Detroit Lions players
Philadelphia Eagles players
Eastern Conference Pro Bowl players